Longevilles-Mont-d'Or (unofficial also Les Longevilles) is a commune in the Doubs department in the Bourgogne-Franche-Comté region in eastern France.

Geography
The village lies in a valley at the foot of the Mont d'Or, a massif that covers 90% of the territory of the commune.

The commune has views of the Alps and the Swiss plain.

Population

Economy
Winter sports and tourism dominate the economy of the commune. It is one of the six communes that have operated the Métabief Mont-d'Or ski resort since 1970.

See also
 Communes of the Doubs department

References

External links

 Les Longesville-Mont-d'Or on the intercommunal Web site of the department 

Communes of Doubs